Salvelinus colii, also called Cole's char, Enniskillen char or Trevelyan's char, is a cold-water species of char fish in the family Salmonidae.

Salvelinus colii is currently located in Ireland, in several lakes draining westward, in County Clare, County Kerry, County Galway, County Mayo, County Donegal and County Westmeath. Lough Ennell and Lough Conn are major sites.

Taxonomy

Name

The English word "char[r]" is thought to derive from Old Irish ceara/cera meaning "[blood] red," referring to its pink-red underside. This would also connect with its Welsh name torgoch, "red belly."

Biology

Salvelinus colii spawns in November/December. Feeds on benthic and planktonic invertebrates.

References

External links

colii
Freshwater fish of Ireland
Fish described in 1863
Taxa named by Albert Günther